Tamer Ahmed Abdul-Hamid (born 16 October 1971) is an Egyptian footballer who played as a defender. He competed in the 1992 Summer Olympics.

References

1971 births
Living people
Footballers at the 1992 Summer Olympics
Egyptian footballers
Association football defenders
Olympic footballers of Egypt